The Westerglen transmitting station is a facility for longwave and mediumwave broadcasting established in 1932 at Westerglen Farm, 2 miles (3 km) south west of Falkirk, Stirlingshire, Scotland.

Four medium wave radio programmes are broadcast from the site on frequencies of 810, 909, 1089 and 1215 kHz and a long wave service on 198 kHz.

There are three guyed steel lattice mast radiators on the site, which are insulated against ground. These carry combinations of the above services. There is a shorter fourth mast that carries non broadcast services.

One of the masts carries the long wave transmission in a synchronised group with the transmitters at Droitwich and Burghead on the same frequency (until 1989 200 kHz, now 198 kHz). This mast is of guyed steel lattice construction with triangular cross-section and it carries a 'capacity hat', which increases the antenna's efficiency, at the top.

The site is owned and operated by Arqiva.

Transmissions
A number of items in the BBC Radio 4 schedule are carried on the longwave frequency only: these include Yesterday in Parliament at 0835–0900 on Tuesdays to Fridays, The Daily Service at 0945–1000 on Mondays to Fridays, the Shipping Forecast at 1201–1204 daily and 1754–1757 on Mondays to Fridays, and Test Match Special during international cricket games.

A number of programmes on BBC Radio Scotland are different on Medium wave compared to the FM schedule as well.

The medium wave broadcast is strong enough to be heard as far south as the West Midlands at certain times of the day.

Services available

See also
List of masts
List of radio stations in the United Kingdom

References

External links
 Westerglen at The Transmission Gallery
 http://www.wabweb.net/radio/radio/lw2.htm#Droitwich
 
 
 Map of site

Radio in the United Kingdom
Transmitter sites in Scotland